Coochie may refer to:

 Coochee (alternative spelling), a slang descriptor used in relation to a belly dance
 Hoochie coochie, a catch-all term to describe several sexually provocative belly dance-like dances
 The town on Coochiemudlo Island, a small island in Moreton Bay, near Brisbane, Queensland, Australia
 Slang word for vagina